Pavel Vadimovich Seliverstau (born 2 September 1996) is a Belarusian track and field athlete who competes in the high jump. He was a bronze medallist at the 2017 European Athletics Indoor Championships and represented his country at the 2016 European Athletics Championships.

In his youth, he competed at the 2013 World Youth Championships in Athletics and the 2015 European Athletics Junior Championships.

International competitions

References

External links

Living people
1996 births
Belarusian male high jumpers